The Algeria national judo team represents Algeria at the international judo competitions such as Olympic Games or World Judo Championships.

Medal count
Algeria has 9 participations in the Summer Olympic of 27 editions held from 1896 to 2016.

List of medalists at Olympic Games

List of medalists at Paralympic Games

List of medalists at World Championships

List of medalists at Summer Universiade

List of medalists at Mediterranean Games

See also
Algeria at the Olympics

References

External links
Athletics at Summer Olympics

National team
judo